Joseph Vonlanthen (born 31 May 1942, in St. Ursen) is a former racing driver from Switzerland.  He participated in one Formula One World Championship Grand Prix, on 17 August 1975, driving a Williams.  He retired with engine failure, scoring no championship points.

Vonlanthen started in Formula Vee, before progressing to Formula Three, where he won the Swiss Formula 3 Championship. He found things a little tougher in Formula Two, but managed to secure a seat with Frank Williams for the non-championship Swiss Grand Prix in 1975, where he finished 14th. He also made a World Championship start in the 1975 Austrian Grand Prix. Vonlanthen can be considered lucky to have started this race, as he was only allowed to start when Wilson Fittipaldi suffered an injury in practice which prevented him from taking his place on the grid.

He subsequently returned to Formula 2 before disappearing from the sport's higher levels.

Racing record

Complete European Formula Two Championship results
(key) (Races in bold indicate pole position; races in italics indicate fastest lap)

Complete Formula One World Championship results
(key) (Races in bold indicate pole position, races in italics indicate fastest lap)

References
Profile at grandprix.com

1942 births
Living people
Sportspeople from the canton of Fribourg
Swiss racing drivers
Swiss Formula One drivers
Williams Formula One drivers
European Formula Two Championship drivers
Swiss Formula Three Championship drivers